Banda Deul is an 11th-century temple in Banda village (also called Deulghera) in the Raghunathpur II CD block in the Raghunathpur subdivision of the Purulia district in the Indian state of West Bengal.

Geography

Location

Banda is 1 km from Cheliyama, which contains the Radha Vinod temple with the most richly decorated terracotta carvings.

There are three dilapidated  at Para, located nearby, belonging to the 10-11th century or earlier.

Note: The map alongside presents some of the notable locations in the subdivision. All places marked in the map are linked in the larger full screen map.

Banda Deul
There is a temple at Banda, which is described by the Archaeological Society of India as a rekha deul of triratha variety in sandstone. “The temple is richly decorated, the themes being creepers, scroll work and stylised chaitya window.” The temple was built around the 11th century.

In 1872, the archaeologist J.D.Beglar came across this temple, then covered with deep vegetation in a forest. The area around the deul was cleared and it started attracting attention. Adrish Bardhan, a science fiction enthusiast and writer, established that the structure of the Banda deul was vandalised by the soldiers of Firuz Shah Tughlaq in 1360. “It is not clear whether it was a Hindu or a Jain temple. The jagmohan part of the temple (the middle tier of a typical Odisha-style three-tier temple) was never completed and the peerless floral designs carved on soft stone on the front façade were badly defaced. The circled crown on the top (known as amalaka) was also broken.” 
 
The temple had a mandapa which has largely collapsed, However, eight pillars are still there supporting the cross beams. The temple has a water outlet with a makara (crocodile) head.

According to the List of Monuments of National Importance in West Bengal the old temple at Banda is an ASI listed monument.

Banda picture gallery

References

External links

Temples in West Bengal
Monuments of National Importance in West Bengal
Tourist attractions in Purulia district